The Fire Next Time is an audio documentary on the history and consequences of the Gulf War and following economic sanctions against Iraq. Produced by filmmaker Grant Wakefield, the 2-CD set featured music from electronic artists including Michael Stearns, Pan Sonic, and Aphex Twin.

Background
The Fire Next Time originated when Wakefield and co-writer Miriam Ryle traveled to Iraq in order to film a follow-up to Ryle's documentary Voices in Iraq. Their footage, including an interview with U.N. Humanitarian Coordinator Hans-Christof von Sponeck critical of the sanctions on Iraq, was rejected by the BBC and Channel 4, with BBC World responding that they "do not accept rant pieces".  Wakefield and Ryle instead produced a documentary for CD, consisting of spoken word, music, and clips of statements made by officials, journalists, and media pundits.

Track listing

Reception
The Fire Next Time was named as one of the best 50 albums of 2002 by The Wire magazine.

References

External links
 Official website

2002 albums
2000s spoken word albums
Ambient albums
Audio documentaries
Electronic compilation albums
Intelligent dance music albums
Works about the Gulf War